Lamprocystis hahajimana is a species of small air-breathing land snails, terrestrial pulmonate gastropod mollusks in the family Euconulidae, the hive snails.

This species is endemic to Japan. The specific epithet is taken from the name of the island Hahajima.

References

Molluscs of Japan
Lamprocystis
Taxonomy articles created by Polbot